Princess Rongshou of the First Rank (1854 – 1924), was a Chinese princess, daughter of Prince Gong and Lady Gūwalgiya.  In 1865, she became the adoptive daughter of Empress Dowager Cixi. She had an important position at the Imperial court as the personal confidant and adviser of Cixi, with permission to speak openly to her, and acted as intermediary for supplicants. 

At the time of her death she was the last Imperial Princess by birth of the Last Imperial Dynasty of China.

References 

1854 births
1924 deaths
Qing dynasty princesses
19th-century Chinese women
19th-century Chinese people